Bosguérard-de-Marcouville is a former commune in the Eure department in Normandy in northern France. On 1 January 2017, it was merged into the new commune Les Monts du Roumois.

History
The commune is located in the countryside of the Roumois. It was created in 1844 from the union of Marcouville-en-Roumois and Saint-Denis-du-Bosguérard.

Demography

See also
Communes of the Eure department

References

Former communes of Eure